Suman Bala is an Indian politician who serving Mayor of Municipal Corporation of Faridabad.

References 

Mayors of places in Haryana
Women mayors of places in Haryana
Year of birth missing (living people)
Living people